Medicago intertexta, the hedgehog medick, Calvary clover, or Calvary medick, is a flowering plant of the family Fabaceae. It is found primarily in the western Mediterranean basin. It forms a symbiotic relationship with the bacterium Sinorhizobium medicae, which is capable of nitrogen fixation.

A form with red-blotched leaves was formerly much grown as a garden plant.

Gallery

References

External links 
 International Legume Database & Information Services

intertexta
Taxa named by Philip Miller
Flora of Malta